Amy Rule (born 15 July 2000) is a New Zealand rugby union player. She plays for the Black Ferns internationally and was a member of their 2021 Rugby World Cup champion squad. She also plays for Matatū in the Super Rugby Aupiki competition and represents Canterbury provincially.

Rugby career 
Rule only took up rugby in her final year at Aparima College; although her school did not have a rugby team, she was allowed to play for Central Southland College or any team that needed another player. After High School, she moved to Christchurch in 2019 for University. She played for Canterbury in the Farah Palmer Cup.

2019–2020 
In 2019, she was selected in the New Zealand Development XV's team that competed at the Oceania Rugby Women's Championship. She played for the New Zealand Barbarians against the Black Ferns in 2020.

2021 
Rule was selected for the Black Ferns Autumn International Tour. She made her international debut for New Zealand on their Northern Tour, against England on 7 November at Northampton. She signed with Matatū for the inaugural Super Rugby Aupiki.

2022 
Rule was selected for the Black Ferns squad for the 2022 Pacific Four Series. She was recalled into the squad for a two-test series against the Wallaroos for the Laurie O'Reilly Cup in August. A month later she was selected for the Black Ferns 2021 Rugby World Cup 32-player squad.

Rule scored a try against Wales in the quarterfinals of the deferred World Cup. In the World Cup final against England, she scored a try from the back of a maul just before half-time.

References

External links 

 Black Ferns Profile

2000 births
Living people
New Zealand women's international rugby union players
New Zealand female rugby union players
People from Lumsden, New Zealand